Dulzura (Spanish for "Gentleness" or "Sweetness") is an unincorporated community in San Diego County, California.

Geography
The ZIP Code is 91917 and the community is inside area code 619. The community is largely rural and has a population of only about 700 people.

It is located 25 miles southeast of the city of San Diego, about 10 miles north of the U.S.-Mexican border, and on the east side of the San Ysidro Mountains.

History
Dulzura is derived from a Spanish name meaning "gentleness". Another theory is that the name is derived from the thriving honey industry that began in the area in 1869 and comes from the Spanish translation of Dulzura meaning "sweetness".

Although it was also the place of death for former Major League Baseball pitcher Eric Show, it was best known between 1908 and 1914 as the home of a delicacy known as "Clark's Pickelized Figs," a candied fruit that was sold from small firkins at grocery stores across the United States. The figs were produced at Clark Ranch by Frank and Lila Clark. The advent of World War I resulted in a sugar shortage which effectively ended the family business. The Clark Ranch remains in the family to the present day, and the original "Pickle House" is now the tasting room for Dulzura Vineyard & Winery.

The landmark Dulzura Schoolhouse was a one-room fixture in the community from the 1900s until it was closed in the 1950s.

Climate
According to the Köppen Climate Classification system, Dulzura has a warm-summer Mediterranean climate, abbreviated "Csa" on climate maps.

References

Unincorporated communities in San Diego County, California
Mountain Empire (San Diego County)
San Ysidro Mountains
Unincorporated communities in California